Bigul is a village in Bageshwar District, Uttarakhand state, India. It is located a short drive from Chaukori, a popular tourist destination.

Villages in Bageshwar district